The Vineyard Golf Club on Martha's Vineyard, Massachusetts, opened in 2002 and uses no synthetic pesticides, fertilizers or herbicides  making it the only organic golf course in the U.S. that uses organic turf management.

History 
Fearing pollution of the island's only aquifer, community members required the Vineyard Golf Club use organic management before permitting it to open. 

The superintendent at the Vineyard Golf Club from 2002-2015, Jeff Carlson, was the recipient of the 2003 GCSAA/Golf Digest Environmental Leaders in Golf Award and is the 2008 winner of the President's Award for Environmental Stewardship.Carlson has used the course as a test site for new maintenance practices and products which have helped other courses become more environmentally friendly. 

The Vineyard Golf Club gained further press coverage in 2009 when President Barack Obama played the course, and then in 2010 when he returned to Martha's Vineyard and played the course multiple times.

Golf Magazine published a report about organic golf courses and reported that golfers have unrealistic expectations of golf course greens, which causes the use of pesticides by course superintendents. Researchers Kit Wheeler and John Nauright call this phenomenon “Augusta National Syndrome.”

Kevin Banks succeeded Carlson as superintendent.

Turf management 
The course uses cultural techniques, such as rolling to reduce pest pressure. It maintains a test plot to trial new grass species for disease and pest resistance. The course uses biological fungicides and organic pesticides listed with the Organic Materials Review Institute.

References

External links 
 Vineyard Golf Club website
 New York Times, Organic Golf Course
 Golf Digest, The Golf Course Superintendent

2002 establishments in Massachusetts
Buildings and structures in Dukes County, Massachusetts
Martha's Vineyard
Golf clubs and courses in Massachusetts
Sports venues completed in 2002
Tourist attractions in Edgartown, Massachusetts